"Beneath Your Beautiful" is a song by British musicians Labrinth and Emeli Sandé. Written by Labrinth, Mike Posner and Sandé, it was promoted as the sixth single from Labrinth's debut album, Electronic Earth (2012), and is included as a bonus track on the US Deluxe Edition of Sandé's debut studio album Our Version of Events. Impacting from 18 October 2012, and following a well-received performance on the ninth series of The X Factor, the single would go on to sell 108,000 copies in the UK during its first week and top the UK Singles Chart. It became Labrinth's first number one single as a lead artist and additionally became his first top 40 hit on the US Billboard Hot 100, where it peaked at number 34. The song was nominated for 'Best British Single' at the 2013 Brit Awards and was ranked the twelfth best-selling single of 2012 in the UK.

Background and release 
"Beneath Your Beautiful" is an R&B ballad written by Labrinth, Mike Posner, and Emeli Sandé.  It was recorded as a duet between Labrinth and Sandé for Labrinth's debut studio album Electronic Earth.  The title of the song attracted attention from fans, some of whom questioned Labrinth about the spelling of the word "Your" within the song's title, believing that was a grammatical error and should have been spelt "You're" (although the song's lyrics use the words "beautiful" and "perfect" as nouns).  Upon reaching number one, fans asked Labrinth via social networking website Twitter about the spelling.  He replied "Can I make something clear! this is twitter! Not an English GCSE haha I’ll spell as BADLY as I wish awritemayte!... Oh is this about #Beneath”YOUR”Beautiful I love how crazy this has sent people…. It was to annoy English teachers and grammar Nazis." The song was nominated for the Brit Award for Best British Single at the 2013 Brit Awards.

Chart and sales performance
The song was released in the UK on 18 November 2011. Originally only reaching number 200 in the UK Singles Chart on 14 April 2012, it peaked at number one on 28 October 2012, selling 108,000 copies in its first week of release. This became Labrinth's first number one single as a solo artist, and Sandé's second number one overall. To date, "Beneath Your Beautiful" has peaked within the top 40 in over 15 countries worldwide.

The song was the 12th best-selling single of 2012 in the UK, with 663,000 copies sold and was certified as Platinum.

Music video
The music video for the track was uploaded to Labrinth's official Vevo account on YouTube on 5 October 2012. The video features Labrinth and Sandé performing the track while standing in front of a giant screen, which features images of them both.

Live performances
On 21 October 2012, Labrinth and Sandé performed the song live for the first time on The X Factor, which led to the sales boost that got it number one. Since the performance on The X Factor, the video has gained more than 14 million views.

At Capital FM's Summertime Ball 2013, on Sunday 9 June 2013, Labrinth performed the song with The X Factor 2012 finalist Ella Henderson live, as part of his setlist, with Henderson replacing Sandé.

Track listing

Notes
 "Express Yourself" contains a sample song of the same name written by Charles Wright and performed by Charles Wright & the Watts 103rd Street Rhythm Band and "Funky Drummer" written and performed by James Brown.

Charts

Weekly charts

Year-end charts

Certifications

Release history

References

2012 singles
Labrinth songs
Contemporary R&B ballads
Songs written by Emeli Sandé
Irish Singles Chart number-one singles
Number-one singles in Poland
Number-one singles in Scotland
UK Singles Chart number-one singles
Emeli Sandé songs
Songs written by Mike Posner
Syco Music singles
Song recordings produced by Labrinth
Songs written by Labrinth
2012 songs
2010s ballads